Die Hochzeit des Camacho (Camacho's Wedding) is a Singspiel in two acts by Felix Mendelssohn, to a libretto probably written largely by , based on an episode in Don Quixote by Cervantes. The opera is listed as Mendelssohn's op. 10. It was written between 1824 and 1825, and first performed publicly at the Berlin Schauspielhaus on 29 April 1827.

Background
Mendelssohn was only 15 when he began to write Camacho, but he had already written other Singspiel for performance within the family circle. The first act was completed in 1824, and he began work on the overture in February 1825. He revised Camacho carefully to make it worthy of public performance. According to Felix's friend Eduard Devrient, who was to sing the role of Camacho, "motherly fondness yearned to witness the son's great success". The music to Camacho indicates that he had carefully studied the operas of Carl Maria von Weber and of Mozart. Despite Mendelssohn's youth, there are some striking features, including what is in effect a leitmotif played on the brass to characterise Don Quixote, which is also heard in the opening bars of the overture and in the opera's final cadence.

Before the work was accepted for the Berlin stage, it was reviewed by Spontini, who was conductor at the Berlin Court Opera. According to Devrient:
The score was criticised with pitying deprecation, winding up with the following admonition – as Spontini led the young man to the window which was opposite to the dome of the Jewish church [synagogue] – 'Mon ami, il vous faut des idées grandes, grandes comme cette coupole'. [My friend, you should have big ideas, as big as that dome]

The rehearsals were hampered by the illness of Blume (he contracted jaundice) who was singing Quixote. In the event, Mendelssohn grew impatient during the premiere, and left before the second act. Devrient comments, "the house was crowded with well-wishers, and the applause was profuse and enthusiastic; the music however did not give genuine pleasure". Some acerbic criticism appeared in the press, some of it apparently taunting Mendelssohn's Jewish origins. The poet Ludwig Rellstab also criticised the cumbersome libretto. The experience soured Mendelssohn towards both opera and journalism. He cancelled all further performances of Camacho; it remained therefore the only one of his operas to have a public performance in his lifetime. However, a piano score of the opera was published in 1828, probably subsidized by Felix's father Abraham Mendelssohn.

There was a single performance of the opera in Boston in 1885, but the first modern performance of Mendelssohn's final version of the opera was on 24 February 1987 at the Oxford Playhouse. In 1992 Jos Van Immerseel made a CD-recording of the work (Channel Classics).

Roles

Synopsis
Carrasco intends Quitieria, against her will, to marry Camacho. Don Quixote and Sancho Panza are invited to the wedding celebrations. Basilio, Quitieria's true love, enlists Lucinda and Vivaldo to assist him by various stratagems. Many of these are foiled inadvertently by the eccentric behaviour of Quixote. Eventually Basilio pretends to stab himself and begs to marry Quitieria so that he can die happy. On Basilio's instant recovery after the ceremony, Camacho admits defeat.

Notes

Sources
Eduard Devrient, tr. Natalia Macfarren, My Reminiscences of Felix Mendelssohn-Bartholdy, London, 1869
R. Larry Todd, Mendelssohn, A Life in Music. Oxford, 2003

Further reading
Clive Brown, "Die Hochzeit des Camacho", Grove Music Online.

External links

Operas
1827 operas
Singspiele
German-language operas
Operas by Felix Mendelssohn
Operas based on Don Quixote
Operas set in Spain